James William Loewen (February 6, 1942August 19, 2021) was an American sociologist, historian, and author. He was best known for his 1995 book, Lies My Teacher Told Me: Everything Your American History Textbook Got Wrong.

Early life
Loewen was born in Decatur, Illinois, on February 6, 1942.  His father, David, was a medical director and physician from an immigrant Mennonite community; his mother, Winifred (Gore), was a librarian and teacher.  Loewen was raised in Decatur, where he attended MacArthur High School and was a National Merit Scholar as a graduate in 1960.

Loewen attended Carleton College. In 1963, as a junior, he spent a semester in Mississippi, an experience in a different culture that led him to question what he had been taught about United States history. He was intrigued by learning about the unique place of nineteenth-century Chinese immigrants and their descendants in Mississippi culture, commonly thought of as biracial. Loewen went on to earn a PhD in sociology from Harvard University based on his research on Chinese Americans in Mississippi.

Career
Loewen first taught in Mississippi at Tougaloo College, a historically black college founded by the American Missionary Association after the American Civil War. For 20 years, Loewen taught about racism at the University of Vermont, where he was professor emeritus of sociology. Since 1997, he had been a visiting professor of sociology at the Catholic University of America in Washington, D.C. He was selected for honoris causa membership in Omicron Delta Kappa in 1997 at SUNY Plattsburgh.

First Amendment battle
Loewen co-wrote a Mississippi history textbook, Mississippi: Conflict and Change (1974), which won the Lillian Smith Book Award for Best Southern Nonfiction in 1975. The book was rejected for use in Mississippi's public schools by the Mississippi Textbook Purchasing Board on the grounds that it was too controversial and placed too much focus on racial matters.

Loewen challenged the Board's decision in a lawsuit, Loewen v. Turnipseed (1980). Judge Orma R. Smith of the U.S. District Court for the Northern District of Mississippi ruled that the rejection of the textbook was not based on "justifiable grounds", and that the authors were denied their right to free speech and press.

The American Library Association considers Loewen v. Turnipseed, 488 F. Supp. 1138 (N.D. Miss. 1980), a historic First Amendment case and one of the foundations of the "right to read freely."

Lies My Teacher Told Me

Loewen spent two years at the Smithsonian Institution, where he studied and compared 12 American history textbooks then widely used throughout the United States.  He published his findings in Lies My Teacher Told Me: Everything Your American History Textbook Got Wrong (1995), which was republished in 2007 and 2018. He concluded that textbook authors propagate factually false, Eurocentric, and mythologized views of history. Loewen points out in the book that many of the distortions found in American history texts are "not even by the authors whose names grace the cover." In March 2012, the book's publisher, The New Press, listed Lies My Teacher Told Me as their top all-time bestseller.  The book reflects Loewen's belief that history should not be taught as straightforward facts and dates to memorize, but rather as analysis of the context and root causes of events.

Lies My Teacher Told Me: Young Readers’ Edition 
Rebecca Stefoff, known for her adaptation of Howard Zinn's bestseller A People's History of the United States for young readers, makes Lies My Teacher Told Me accessible for younger readers in Lies My Teacher Told Me: Young Readers Edition (2019).

Teaching What Really Happened
Loewen built on Lies My Teacher Told Me in Teaching What Really Happened: How to Avoid the Tyranny of Textbooks & Get Students Excited About Doing History (Teachers College Press, 2009). The  first four chapters lay out an argument for how history should be taught at the elementary and secondary levels, while chapters 5–10 address teaching specific issues in history.

Sundown Towns

Continuing his interest in racism in the United States, Loewen wrote Sundown Towns: A Hidden Dimension of American Racism, which was released in 2005. The book documents the histories of sundown towns, which are towns where African Americans, Jews, and other minority groups were forced (or strongly encouraged) to leave before sundown to avoid racist violence by the towns' white residents. 

Loewen wrote about sundown towns repeatedly throughout his career, including in Lies Across America, where he called the affluent suburb of Darien, Connecticut, a modern-day de facto sundown town.

Sundown Towns won the Gustavus Myers Outstanding Book Award. It also gained excellent reviews in Publishers Weekly and Booklist. The book inspired a nationwide online initiative to monitor and list sunset towns across the USA. A review in The Washington Post argued that even though Loewen dedicated an entire chapter to research methodology, his statements regarding the number of communities which supported racial exclusion policies were widely variable and vague. "This vagueness, along with Loewen's almost evangelical passion for his material, raises questions of credibility – or at least of potential overstatement."

Later writings 
In 2010, Loewen and Edward H. Sebesta co-wrote the book The Confederate and Neo-Confederate Reader: The Great Truth about the Lost Cause, an anthology containing a wide array of primary source documents pertaining to the Confederacy from the time of the American Civil War.

Loewen's last published book, Up a Creek, With a Paddle: Tales of Canoeing and Life, is a memoir in which he returned to his life’s work and addressed the origins of racism and inequality, the theory of history, and the ties between the two.

Before his death, Loewen began researching for a new book, Surprises on the Landscape: Unexpected Places That Get History Right. The book was planned as follow-up to Lies Across America, which noted historically inaccurate or misleading historical markers and sites across the United States.  Surprises was planned to call attention to historical sites that are accurate and provide honest representations of events.  His official website invited the public to comment on what towns and historical sites should be included in terms of presenting history right.

Personal life
Loewen married his first wife, Patricia Hanrahan, in 1968.  Together, they had two children.  They divorced in 1975.  He married his second wife, Susan Robertson, in 2006.  They remained married until his death.

Loewen died on August 19, 2021, at Suburban Hospital in Bethesda, Maryland.  He was 79, and had been diagnosed with Stage IV bladder cancer two years prior to his death.

Bibliography
Loewen has published the following works:

References

External links

 James W. Loewen's page at History News Network

1942 births
2021 deaths
American education writers
21st-century American historians
21st-century American male writers
American sociologists
American textbook writers
American male non-fiction writers
American anti-racism activists
Historians of race relations
Carleton College alumni
Education reform
Harvard University alumni
Writers from Decatur, Illinois
Catholic University of America School of Arts and Sciences faculty
University of Vermont faculty
American Book Award winners
Historians from Illinois
American Mennonites
Mennonite writers
Deaths from bladder cancer
Deaths from cancer in Maryland